The intersecting chords theorem or just the chord theorem is a statement in elementary geometry that describes a relation of the four line segments created by two intersecting chords within a circle. 
It states that the products of the lengths of the line segments on each chord are equal. 
It is Proposition 35 of Book 3 of Euclid's Elements. 

More precisely, for two chords AC and BD intersecting in a point S the following equation holds:

The converse is true as well, that is if for two line segments AC and BD intersecting in S the equation above holds true, then their four endpoints A, B, C and D lie on a common circle. Or in other words if the diagonals of a quadrilateral ABCD intersect in S and fulfill the equation above then it is a cyclic quadrilateral.

The value of the two products in the chord theorem depends only on the distance of the intersection point S from the circle's center and is called the absolute value of the power of S, more precisely it can be stated that:

where r is the radius of the circle, and d is the distance between the center of the circle and the intersection point S. This property follows directly from applying the chord theorem to a third chord going through S and the circle's center M (see drawing).

The theorem can be proven using similar triangles (via the  inscribed-angle theorem). Consider the angles of the triangles ASD and BSC:
  
This means the triangles ASD and BSC are similar and therefore

Next to the tangent-secant theorem and the intersecting secants theorem the intersecting chords theorem represents one of the three basic cases of a more general theorem about two intersecting lines and a circle - the power of point theorem.

References
Paul Glaister: Intersecting Chords Theorem: 30 Years on. Mathematics in School, Vol. 36, No. 1 (Jan., 2007), p. 22 (JSTOR)
Bruce Shawyer: Explorations in Geometry. World scientific, 2010, p. 14
 Hans Schupp: Elementargeometrie. Schöningh, Paderborn 1977, p. 149 (German).
Schülerduden - Mathematik I. Bibliographisches Institut & F.A. Brockhaus, 8. Auflage, Mannheim 2008, pp. 415-417 (German)

External links 
Intersecting Chords Theorem at cut-the-knot.org
Intersecting Chords Theorem at proofwiki.org
 
Two interactive illustrations:  and 

Theorems about circles